Citrinophila terias is a butterfly in the family Lycaenidae. It is found in southern Cameroon, Gabon, the Republic of the Congo, the Democratic Republic of the Congo (Uele, Tshuapa, Sankuru and Lualaba), and Zambia.

References

Butterflies described in 1921
Poritiinae